Panavely is a village situated near Kottarakkara  in Kollam District, Kerala state, India.

Politics
Panaveli is a part of PATHANAPURAM assembly constituency in Mavelikkara (Lok Sabha constituency). Sri KB GANESH KUMAR is the current MLA of PATHANAPURAM. Shri.Kodikkunnil Suresh is the current member of parliament of Mavelikkara. Panavei is a part of Vettikkavala panchayat and part of Vettikkavala Block Panchayat. CPM, INC, CPI, BJP, KC(B) etc are the major political parties.

Geography
Panaveli is a small village near Kottarakkara.

Transport

References

Geography of Kollam district